Pterosphenus is an extinct genus of marine snake of the Eocene period.

Classification 
Pterosphenus belong to the Alethinophidia snakes, a clade which includes all snakes outside of blind and thread snakes, and more specifically to the extinct Palaeophiidae. Its closest relative is Palaeophis, of which both belong to the subfamily Palaeopheinae. Five species are known, P. schucherti from North America, P. sheppardi from South America, P. schweinfurthi from northern Africa and P. biswasi, and P. kutchensis from Asia.

Description 
While only known from partial remains, enough has been found of Pterosphenus to suggest it was a large reptile. Its body was strongly laterally compressed as an adaptation to pelagic life.

Palaeoenvironment and Palaeoecology 
A marine ocean dweller, Pterosphenus lived in the shallow seas of the future eastern US (fossils are known from Texas, Louisiana, Mississippi, and Arkansas and up north to New Jersey), northern Africa in the Tethys Ocean (fossils are known from Morocco, Libya, and Egypt), South America (fossils are known from Ecuador) and southern Asia (fossils are known from India). Pterosphenus was a top predator of the ecosystem, likely preying on fish and molluscs found in the same area.

It is certain that Pterosphenus would have encountered basal cetaceans of the time like Zygorhiza, Dorudon, and Basilosaurus, though its likely a mixed of niche partitioning and living in different areas in the case of Basilosaurus (which lived in estuary ecosystems according to recent finds) would prevent competition between the species.

References 

Extinct reptiles

Sea snakes
Eocene reptiles of Africa
Eocene reptiles of North America
Eocene reptiles of Asia
Eocene reptiles of South America